Deleter is a 2022 Philippine techno-horror film directed by Mikhail Red, starring Nadine Lustre, Louise delos Reyes, McCoy de Leon, and Jeffrey Hidalgo. It was released theatrically on December 25, 2022 as an entry to the 2022 Metro Manila Film Festival.

Premise
The film follows Lyra (Nadine Lustre), who works shifts at a shadowy online content moderation office where employees, known as deleters, are tasked with the process of filtering graphic uploads from reaching social media platforms. The responsibility of censorship proves bearable for Lyra, whom her co-workers, as well as her boss Simon (Jeffrey Hidalgo), observe as a cold person unfazed by the disturbing imagery she sees on a daily basis. What they do not know is that Lyra hides a deep trauma. Lyra’s attempt to erase and forget her past has forced her to maintain an apathetic face to the horrors of the world.

Cast

Main
 Nadine Lustre as Lyra
 Louise delos Reyes as Aileen
 McCoy de Leon as Jace
 Jeffrey Hidalgo as Simon

Supporting
 Sarah Jane Abad as Armi
 Billy Villeta as Axel
 Madelaine Red
 Elia Ilano as young Lyra
 Kedebon Colim
 Keiko Fox
 Charo Laude
 Matthew Francisco as Benru
 Nic Galvez
 Bombi Plata as Lyra's father

Production

Development 
Deleter was reported to be the first collaboration between Mikhail Red and Viva Films. Red worked on the Philippines' reputation being the "content moderation capital of the world" as well as the mental health and working conditions of content moderators for the story of Deleter.

Filming 
Filming began in July 2022 amidst the COVID-19 pandemic and hence the usual COVID-19 protocols was observed. Only a few filming locations was utilized to simulate a "claustrophobic environment".

Release
Deleter premiered in cinemas in the Philippines on December 25, 2022 as one of the eight entries of the 2022 Metro Manila Film Festival. However the film was not originally intended made specifically for the film festival.

The film was also released internationally. It premiered in the United States on January 6, 2023 and is set to be released in the United Arab Emirates on January 12, 2023.

Awards and nominations

Reception

Box office
According to unofficial figures obtained by PEP.ph, Deleter has reportedly earned  on the first day of the 2022 Metro Manila Film Festival, becoming the film with the second biggest opening for any entries that day. By the end of the year, Ogie Diaz, a showbiz columnist and talent manager reported that Deleter earned  making it the top grossing film among the entries. On January 8, 2023, the film maintained its top spot after already grossing .

References

External links
 

Viva Films films
Philippine horror films
Philippine science fiction horror films
Philippine ghost films
Films about nightmares
Techno-horror films
Psychological horror films
Psychological thriller films
Filipino-language films
Films directed by Mikhail Red
Films impacted by the COVID-19 pandemic
Films about social media
Films about censorship